Shantel Suleon Bailey (born 30 April 1995) is a Jamaican footballer who plays as a midfielder for the Jamaica women's national team.

International career
Bailey made her senior debut for Jamaica on 20 April 2018 at the 2018 CFU Women's Challenge Series.

International goals
Scores and results list Jamaica's goal tally first

References 

1995 births
Living people
Women's association football midfielders
Jamaican women's footballers
Jamaica women's international footballers